Robert Campbell (8 January 1843 – 10 December 1889) was a 19th-century New Zealand Member of Parliament representing Oamaru (Otago).

Born near London, the son of Robert "Tertius" Campbell, he came to New Zealand in 1860. On 2 December 1868 in Christchurch, he married Emma Josephine Hawdon, the eldest daughter of Joseph Hawdon, a member of the New Zealand Legislative Council. (His wife's sister later married Edward Wingfield Humphreys.)

He represented the Oamaru electorate from 1866 to 9 April 1869, when he resigned. He was appointed to the Legislative Council on 13 May 1870 and served on it until he died on 10 December 1889.

Notes

References

1843 births
1889 deaths
Members of the New Zealand House of Representatives
Members of the New Zealand Legislative Council
New Zealand MPs for South Island electorates
19th-century New Zealand politicians
English emigrants to New Zealand